Compton Airport may refer to:

 Compton Airport (Illinois) a private use airport in Pocahontas, Illinois, United States (FAA: 3LL9)
 Compton Airport (Oregon) a private use airport in Canby, Oregon, United States (FAA: 44OR)

Airports in places named Compton:
 Compton/Woodley Airport, a public use airport in Compton, California, United States (FAA/IATA: CPM)
 Bresson Airport, a public use airport in Compton, Illinois, United States (FAA/IATA: C82)
 Earl Barnickel Airport, a private use airport in Compton, Illinois, United States (FAA: IL88)
 W Davis Airport, a private use airport in Compton, Illinois, United States (FAA: IL87)